The 1935-36 French Rugby Union Championship was won by Narbonne that beat the Montferrand in the final.

The tournament was played by 40 clubs divided in eight pools of five clubs.
At the second round were admitted the first two of each pool.

Context 

The 1936 International Championship was won by Wales, the France was excluded.

France won the FIRA Tournament in Berlin.

Semifinals

Final

External links
 Compte rendu de la finale de 1936, sur lnr.fr

1936
France
Championship